Voltage Pictures is an American film production and distribution company founded by Nicolas Chartier in 2005. It has assembled over 180 motion pictures, earning the company a total of two Golden Globe Awards and nine Academy Awards.

Recent films 
Recently released by Voltage is The Marksman starring Liam Neeson which opened on January 12, 2021 via Open Road; the second installment of the After franchise, After We Collided, starring Josephine Langford and Hero Fiennes-Tiffin.

Additional releases include I Feel Pretty starring Amy Schumer and Michelle Williams, which grossed nearly $100 million worldwide upon its release in 2018, Extremely Wicked, Shockingly Evil and Vile starring Zac Efron and Lily Collins, which premiered at the 2019 Sundance Film festival and subsequently sold to Netflix, and Ava, directed by Tate Taylor and starring Jessica Chastain, Colin Farrell, John Malkovich, Common, Geena Davis, and Joan Chen.

Sales titles 
The current Voltage sales slate includes upcoming the thriller Fear of Rain starring Harry Connick Jr. and Katherine Heigl, which is due to release February 12, 2021 via Lionsgate, and Body Brokers, which is due to release February 12, 2021 via Vertical Entertainment.  Soon to be released titles include the gangster crime biopic Lanksy starring Harvey Keitel, Sam Worthington and Annasophia Robb, the political biopic Reagan, starring Dennis Quaid, Penelope Ann Miller with Academy Award winner Jon Voight, the horror-thriller The Seventh Day starring Guy Pearce, and war-thriller Condor's Nest starring Arnold Vosloo.

Television 
Voltage Pictures has produced two seasons of “True Justice” starring Steven Seagal which aired on 5USA, the upcoming 12 episode series “Age of The Living Dead / Age of the Undead” and most recently serving as executive producers on “Six” which is currently airing on The History Channel.

Awards 
The Hurt Locker, starring Jeremy Renner took home six Academy Awards, including Best Picture, Best Director and Best Screenplay in 2009. Dallas Buyers Club, directed by Jean-Marc Vallée and starring Matthew McConaughey, Jared Leto and Jennifer Garner. The film received three Academy Awards, including Best Actor and Best Supporting Actor, and two Golden Globes, again in the two acting categories.

Piracy 
In 2014, Voltage Pictures filed a slew of "John Doe" lawsuits against individuals they accused of torrenting the film Dallas Buyers Club, which Voltage had produced.

In 2018, it was discovered that Voltage was attempting to sue 55,000 Canadians for sharing their films online. Policy experts have called this move a case of Copyright trolling.

Films 

 2008 - The Hurt Locker
 2009 - A Dangerous Man
 2010 - The Traveler
 2010 - The Whistleblower
 2010 - Born to Raise Hell
 2010 - Game of Death
 2011 - Killer Joe
 2011 - Faces in the Crowd
 2012 - Rites of Passage
 2012 - The Magic of Belle Isle
 2012 - Generation Um...
 2012 - The Company You Keep
 2012 - Border Run
 2012 - Maximum Conviction
 2012 - Seal Team Six: The Raid on Osama Bin Laden
 2013 - Don Jon
 2013 - Empire State
 2013 - Absolute Deception
 2013 - The Zero Theorem
 2013 - Dallas Buyers Club
 2013 - Ambushed
 2013 - Force of Execution
 2014 - Reasonable Doubt
 2014 - Puncture Wounds
 2014 - A Good Man
 2014 - Burying the Ex
 2014 - Cabin Fever: Patient Zero
 2014 - Good Kill
 2014 - The Cobbler
 2014 - American Heist
 2014 - Playing It Cool
 2015 - Knock Knock'
 2015 - Fathers and Daughters 2015 - Navy Seals vs. Zombies 2015 - Pay the Ghost 2015 - Walt Before Mickey 2016 - Good Kids 2016 - Colossal 2016 - A Family Man 2016 - I.T. 2017 - All Eyez on Me 2017 - Wind River 2017 - Keep Watching 2017 - Once Upon a Time in Venice 2017 - Revolt 2017 - Singularity 2017 - LBJ 2017 - Alien Invasion: S.U.M.1 2018 - I Feel Pretty 2018 - Between Worlds 2018 - Then Came You 2019 -  Daniel Isn't Real 2019 - Extremely Wicked, Shockingly Evil and Vile 2019 - After 2019 - The Professor and the Madman 2019 - VFW 2020 - The 2nd 2020 - After We Collided 2020 - Ava 2020 - Archenemy 2020 - The Call 2021 - The Marksman 2021 - The Seventh Day 2021 - After We Fell 2021 - Lansky 2021 - Deadly Illusions 2021 - Aileen Wuornos: American Boogeywoman 2021 - Crime Story 2022 - After Ever Happy 2023 - Beautiful Disaster TBA - After Everything TBA - Condor's Nest''

References

External links 
 

Mass media companies established in 2005
Film production companies of the United States
Companies based in Los Angeles
American film studios
Film distributors of the United States
Entertainment companies based in California
Entertainment companies established in 2005
2005 establishments in California
Companies based in Los Angeles County, California
International sales agents